Alanyurt is a village in the İscehisar District, Afyonkarahisar Province, Turkey. Its population is 954 (2021). Before the 2013 reorganisation, it was a town (belde). The settlement Selimiye is part of Alanyurt.

References

Villages in İscehisar District